The 2018–19 Brooklyn Nets season was the 43rd season of the franchise in the National Basketball Association (NBA), 52nd season overall, and its seventh season playing in the New York City borough of Brooklyn.

On November 12, 2018, late in the first half of the game against the Minnesota Timberwolves, Caris LeVert suffered a subtalar dislocation of the right foot and was scheduled to return later in the season after rehabilitation, making his return on February 8, 2019. The December 16 game against the Atlanta Hawks at Barclays Center was the highest scoring game at the venue in Nets' history, while the 144 points scored by the Nets were the second-most points scored in regulation in franchise history. On March 19, the Nets came back from a 28-point deficit, which also was the biggest comeback in team history, when they defeated the Sacramento Kings 123–121, and also became just the fourth team since the 1954–55 season to overcome a 25-point deficit in the fourth quarter.

For the first time in his NBA career D'Angelo Russell was selected to participate in the NBA All-Star Game when he was announced as the replacement for the injured Victor Oladipo in the 2019 NBA All-Star Game.

With a 108–96 victory over the Indiana Pacers on April 7, the Nets clinched a playoff spot for the first time since the 2014–15 season. On April 10, in a 113–94 win against the Miami Heat, the Nets clinched their first winning season since 2013–14.

In the playoffs, the Nets faced the Philadelphia 76ers in the First Round, and were defeated in five games.

Draft

The Nets entered the draft holding one first round pick and two second round picks. It became the last draft year where the effects of their Kevin Garnett and Paul Pierce trade with the Boston Celtics would take effect. The first round pick along with the second round pick (40th overall) were acquired on July 13, 2017, in a trade with the Toronto Raptors that sent DeMarre Carroll to the Nets in exchange for Justin Hamilton. The other second round pick (45th overall) was acquired on February 5, 2018, in a trade with the Milwaukee Bucks that sent Rashad Vaughn to the Nets in exchange for Tyler Zeller. However, just days before draft night, the Nets agreed to trade the 45th pick (which became Hamidou Diallo), another second round pick, Timofey Mozgov, and cash considerations to the Charlotte Hornets in exchange for Dwight Howard, although the trade would not be official until July 6, 2018. With the Nets' sole first round pick, Brooklyn selected the Bosnian-born Džanan Musa, a small forward from Croatia's Cedevita Zagreb, while with the second round pick the Nets selected the Latvian-born small forward Rodions Kurucs from Spain's FC Barcelona Lassa.

Roster

Standings

Division

Conference

Game log

Preseason
The preseason schedule was announced on July 9, 2018.

|- style="background:#fbb;"
| 1
| October 3
| New York
| 
| LeVert (15)
| Graham (9)
| Dinwiddie (6)
| Barclays Center12,424
| 0–1
|- style="background:#bfb;"
| 2
| October 8
| @ Detroit
| 
| Russell (25)
| Davis (10)
| LeVert (8)
| Little Caesars Arena7,691
| 1–1
|- style="background:#fbb;"
| 3
| October 10
| @ Toronto
| 
| Allen (24)
| Dinwiddie (7)
| Dinwiddie (8)
| Bell Centre20,526
| 1–2
|- style="background:#bfb;"
| 4
| October 12
| @ New York
| 
| Dinwiddie (19)
| Davis (8)
| Russell (8)
| Madison Square Garden19,812
| 2–2

Regular season
The regular season schedule was released on August 10, 2018.

|- style="background:#fbb;"
| 1
| October 17
| @ Detroit
| 
| LeVert (27)
| Allen (10)
| Dinwiddie (6)
| Little Caesars Arena20,332
| 0–1
|- style="background:#bfb;"
| 2
| October 19
| New York
| 
| LeVert (28)
| Allen (11)
| Dinwiddie, Russell (6)
| Barclays Center17,732
| 1–1
|- style="background:#fbb;"
| 3
| October 20
| @ Indiana
| 
| Harris, LeVert (19)
| Davis (8)
| Russell (7)
| Bankers Life Fieldhouse17,007
| 1–2
|- style="background:#bfb;"
| 4
| October 24
| @ Cleveland
| 
| Russell (18)
| Davis (10)
| Russell (8)
| Quicken Loans Arena19,432
| 2–2
|- style="background:#fbb;"
| 5
| October 26
| @ New Orleans
| 
| Russell (24)
| Davis (11)
| Dinwiddie (5)
| Smoothie King Center15,272
| 2–3
|- style="background:#fbb;"
| 6
| October 28
| Golden State
| 
| Russell (25)
| Davis (7)
| LeVert (7)
| Barclays Center17,732
| 2–4
|- style="background:#fbb;"
| 7
| October 29
| @ New York
| 
| Dinwiddie (17)
| Hollis-Jefferson (7)
| LeVert (5)
| Madison Square Garden19,221
| 2–5
|- style="background:#bfb;"
| 8
| October 31
| Detroit
| 
| Dinwiddie (25)
| Davis (10)
| LeVert, Russell (6)
| Barclays Center12,862
| 3–5

|- style="background:#fbb;"
| 9
| November 2
| Houston
| 
| LeVert (29)
| Allen (8)
| Harris (4)
| Barclays Center14,013
| 3–6
|- style="background:#bfb;"
| 10
| November 4
| Philadelphia
| 
| Hollis-Jefferson, Russell (21)
| Allen (10)
| Dinwiddie (8)
| Barclays Center12,826
| 4–6
|- style="background:#bfb;"
| 11
| November 6
| @ Phoenix
| 
| LeVert (26)
| Davis (12)
| Allen, Napier (5)
| Talking Stick Resort Arena14,205
| 5–6
|- style="background:#bfb;"
| 12
| November 9
| @ Denver
| 
| Russell (23)
| Allen (9)
| Dinwiddie (6)
| Pepsi Center19,520
| 6–6 
|- style="background:#fbb;"
| 13
| November 10
| @ Golden State
| 
| Harris (24)
| Allen, Davis (7)
| Dinwiddie (6)
| Oracle Arena19,596
| 6–7
|- style="background:#fbb;"
| 14
| November 12
| @ Minnesota
| 
| Russell (31)
| Davis (14)
| Russell (6)
| Target Center10,186
| 6–8
|- style="background:#fbb;"
| 15
| November 14
| Miami
| 
| Dinwiddie (18)
| Davis, Hollis-Jefferson (9)
| Dinwiddie, Russell (5)
| Barclays Center13,317
| 6–9
|- style="background:#bfb;"
| 16
| November 16
| @ Washington
| 
| Dinwiddie (25)
| Allen (12)
| Dinwiddie (8)
| Capital One Arena15,102
| 7–9
|- style="background:#fbb;"
| 17
| November 17
| L.A. Clippers
| 
| Allen (24)
| Allen, Davis (11)
| Russell (10)
| Barclays Center12,944
| 7–10
|- style="background:#bfb;"
| 18
| November 20
| @ Miami
| 
| Russell (20)
| Allen (14)
| Dinwiddie (7)
| American Airlines Arena19,600
| 8–10
|- style="background:#fbb;"
| 19
| November 21
| @ Dallas
| 
| Crabbe (27)
| Davis (9)
| Dinwiddie (7)
| American Airlines Center19,926
| 8–11
|- style="background:#fbb;"
| 20
| November 23
| Minnesota
| 
| Dinwiddie, Harris (18)
| Carroll (7)
| Dinwiddie (8)
| Barclays Center12,814
| 8–12
|- style="background:#fbb;"
| 21
| November 25
| Philadelphia
| 
| Russell (38)
| Allen (10)
| Russell (8)
| Barclays Center15,217
| 8–13
|- style="background:#fbb;"
| 22
| November 28
| Utah
| 
| Dinwiddie (18)
| Hollis-Jefferson (11)
| Russell (7)
| Barclays Center12,928
| 8–14
|- style="background:#fbb;"
| 23
| November 30
| Memphis
| 
| Russell (26)
| Allen, Carroll (12)
| Russell (8)
| Barclays Center12,983
| 8–15

|- style="background:#fbb;"
| 24
| December 1
| @ Washington
| 
| Crabbe (14)
| Allen, Hollis-Jefferson (8)
| Dinwiddie (8)
| Capital One Arena15,448
| 8–16
|- style="background:#fbb;"
| 25
| December 3
| Cleveland
| 
| Russell (30)
| Davis (10)
| Russell (6)
| Barclays Center10,983
| 8–17
|- style="background:#fbb;"
| 26
| December 5
| Oklahoma City
| 
| Crabbe (22)
| Hollis-Jefferson (9)
| Hollis-Jefferson (6)
| Barclays Center13,161
| 8–18
|- style="background:#bfb;"
| 27
| December 7
| Toronto
| 
| Russell (29)
| Davis (15)
| Dinwiddie (8)
| Barclays Center14,035
| 9–18
|- style="background:#bfb;"
| 28
| December 8
| @ New York
| 
| Dinwiddie (25)
| Allen (12)
| Russell (11)
| Madison Square Garden18,662
| 10–18
|- style="background:#bfb;"
| 29
| December 12
| @ Philadelphia
| 
| Dinwiddie (39)
| Davis (10)
| Russell (7)
| Wells Fargo Center20,376
| 11–18
|- style="background:#bfb;"
| 30
| December 14
| Washington
| 
| Dinwiddie (27)
| Hollis-Jefferson (9)
| Russell (9)
| Barclays Center13,232
| 12–18
|- style="background:#bfb;"
| 31
| December 16
| Atlanta
| 
| Russell (32)
| Davis (10)
| Russell (7)
| Barclays Center13,955
| 13–18
|- style="background:#bfb;"
| 32
| December 18
| L.A. Lakers
| 
| Russell (22)
| Allen, Hollis-Jefferson (8)
| Russell (13)
| Barclays Center17,732
| 14–18
|- style="background:#bfb;"
| 33
| December 19
| @ Chicago
| 
| Dinwiddie (27)
| Allen (12)
| Harris (4)
| United Center18,065
| 15–18
|- style="background:#fbb;"
| 34
| December 21
| Indiana
| 
| Kurucs (24)
| Davis (10)
| Dinwiddie, Russell (9)
| Barclays Center13,302
| 15–19
|- style="background:#bfb;"
| 35
| December 23
| Phoenix
| 
| Dinwiddie (24)
| Kurucs (10)
| Russell (8)
| Barclays Center15,310
| 16–19
|- style="background:#bfb;"
| 36
| December 26
| Charlotte
| 
| Dinwiddie (37)
| Hollis-Jefferson (15)
| Dinwiddie (11)
| Barclays Center14,309
| 17–19
|- style="background:#fbb;"
| 37
| December 28
| @ Charlotte
| 
| Russell (33)
| Davis (11)
| Dinwiddie (5)
| Spectrum Center19,411
| 17–20
|- style="background:#fbb;"
| 38
| December 29
| @ Milwaukee
| 
| Napier (32)
| Faried (10)
| Napier (7)
| Fiserv Forum17,918
| 17–21

|- style="background:#bfb;"
| 39
| January 2
| New Orleans
| 
| Russell (22)
| Davis (12)
| Russell (13)
| Barclays Center16,890
| 18–21
|- style="background:#bfb;"
| 40
| January 4
| @ Memphis
| 
| Russell (23)
| Allen (12)
| Russell (10)
| FedExForum16,683
| 19–21
|- style="background:#bfb;"
| 41
| January 6
| @ Chicago
| 
| Russell (28)
| Davis (13)
| Dinwiddie, Russell (5)
| United Center19,265
| 20–21
|- style="background:#fbb;"
| 42
| January 7
| @ Boston
| 
| Kurucs (24)
| Faried (12)
| Napier (6)
| TD Garden18,624
| 20–22
|- style="background:#bfb;"
| 43
| January 9
| Atlanta
| 
| Russell (23)
| Davis (16)
| Dinwiddie (5)
| Barclays Center14,531
| 21–22
|- style="background:#fbb;"
| 44
| January 11
| @ Toronto
| 
| Russell (24)
| Allen (12)
| Russell (9)
| Scotiabank Arena19,800
| 21–23
|- style="background:#bfb;"
| 45
| January 14
| Boston
| 
| Russell (34)
| Carroll (14)
| Russell (7)
| Barclays Center16,247
| 22–23
|- style="background:#bfb;"
| 46
| January 16
| @ Houston
| 
| Dinwiddie (33)
| Allen (24)
| Dinwiddie (10)
| Toyota Center18,055
| 23–23
|- style="background:#bfb;"
| 47
| January 18
| @ Orlando
| 
| Russell (40)
| Allen (10)
| Russell (7)
| Amway Center17,840
| 24–23
|- style="background:#bfb;"
| 48
| January 21
| Sacramento
| 
| Russell (31)
| Davis (16)
| Russell (8)
| Barclays Center14,233
| 25–23
|- style="background:#bfb;"
| 49
| January 23
| Orlando
| 
| Dinwiddie (29)
| Allen (11)
| Russell (10)
| Barclays Center13,185
| 26–23
|- style="background:#bfb;"
| 50
| January 25
| New York
| 
| Pinson (19)
| Davis (16)
| Russell (4)
| Barclays Center17,033
| 27–23
|- style="background:#fbb;"
| 51
| January 28
| @ Boston
| 
| Russell (25)
| Davis (11)
| Napier (5)
| TD Garden18,624
| 27–24
|- style="background:#bfb;"
| 52
| January 29
| Chicago
| 
| Russell (30)
| Allen (8)
| Russell (7)
| Barclays Center12,726
| 28–24
|- style="background:#fbb;"
| 53
| January 31
| @ San Antonio
| 
| Russell (25)
| Davis (11)
| Russell (9)
| AT&T Center18,057
| 28–25

|- style="background:#fbb;"
| 54
| February 2
| @ Orlando
| 
| Russell (23)
| Davis (16)
| Russell (6)
| Amway Center17,385
| 28–26
|- style="background:#fbb;"
| 55
| February 4
| Milwaukee
| 
| Russell (18)
| Allen (11)
| Russell (5)
| Barclays Center16,209
| 28–27
|- style="background:#bfb;"
| 56
| February 6
| Denver
| 
| Russell (27)
| Carroll (10)
| Napier, Russell (11)
| Barclays Center14,516
| 29–27
|- style="background:#fbb;"
| 57
| February 8
| Chicago
| 
| Russell (23)
| Allen (10)
| Russell (6)
| Barclays Center15,267
| 29–28
|- style="background:#fbb;"
| 58
| February 11
| @ Toronto
| 
| Russell (28)
| Russell (7)
| Russell (14)
| Scotiabank Arena19,800
| 29–29
|- style="background:#bfb;"
| 59
| February 13
| @ Cleveland
| 
| Russell (36)
| Allen (12)
| LeVert (9)
| Quicken Loans Arena17,434
| 30–29
|- style="background:#fbb;"
| 60
| February 21
| Portland
| 
| Crabbe (17)
| Allen (11)
| Napier (10)
| Barclays Center17,732
| 30–30
|- style="background:#bfb;"
| 61
| February 23
| @ Charlotte
| 
| Russell (40)
| Allen (11)
| Russell (7)
| Spectrum Center19,158
| 31–30
|- style="background:#bfb;"
| 62
| February 25
| San Antonio
| 
| Russell (23)
| Carroll (12)
| Russell (8)
| Barclays Center13,479
| 32–30
|- style="background:#fbb;"
| 63
| February 27
| Washington
| 
| Russell (28)
| Graham (7)
| Russell (7)
| Barclays Center13,683
| 32–31

|- style="background:#fbb;"
| 64
| March 1
| Charlotte
| 
| Russell (22)
| Harris, LeVert (7)
| Russell (9)
| Barclays Center15,578
| 32–32
|- style="background:#fbb;"
| 65
| March 2
| @ Miami
| 
| Harris (15)
| Kurucs (7)
| Russell (8)
| American Airlines Arena19,600
| 32–33
|- style="background:#bfb;"
| 66
| March 4
| Dallas
| 
| Carroll (22)
| Davis (10)
| Russell (11)
| Barclays Center17,064
| 33–33
|- style="background:#bfb;"
| 67
| March 6
| Cleveland
| 
| Dinwiddie (28)
| Davis (12)
| Dinwiddie, Russell (5)
| Barclays Center14,177
| 34–33
|- style="background:#bfb;"
| 68
| March 9
| @ Atlanta
| 
| Dinwiddie (23)
| Allen (12)
| Dinwiddie (7)
| State Farm Arena16,527
| 35–33
|- style="background:#bfb;"
| 69
| March 11
| Detroit
| 
| Dinwiddie (19)
| Crabbe (10)
| Russell (7)
| Barclays Center17,732
| 36–33
|- style="background:#fbb;"
| 70
| March 13
| @ Oklahoma City
| 
| Dinwiddie (25)
| Davis (11)
| Russell (7)
| Chesapeake Energy Arena18,203
| 36–34
|- style="background:#fbb;"
| 71
| March 16
| @ Utah
| 
| Dinwiddie (22)
| Davis (11)
| LeVert, Russell (4)
| Vivint Smart Home Arena18,306
| 36–35
|- style="background:#fbb;"
| 72
| March 17
| @ L.A. Clippers
| 
| Russell (32)
| Allen (11)
| Russell (10)
| Staples Center17,247
| 36–36
|- style="background:#bfb;"
| 73
| March 19
| @ Sacramento
| 
| Russell (44)
| Allen (7)
| Russell (12)
| Golden 1 Center17,583
| 37–36
|- style="background:#bfb;"
| 74
| March 22
| @ L.A. Lakers
| 
| Harris (26)
| Davis (15)
| Russell (13)
| Staples Center18,997
| 38–36
|- style="background:#fbb;"
| 75
| March 25
| @ Portland
| 
| Russell (39)
| Davis (14)
| Russell (8)
| Moda Center20,188
| 38–37
|- style="background:#fbb;"
| 76
| March 28
| @ Philadelphia
| 
| Harris (22)
| Hollis-Jefferson (10)
| Russell (8)
| Wells Fargo Center20,547
| 38–38
|- style="background:#bfb;"
| 77
| March 30
| Boston
| 
| Russell (29)
| Harris (8)
| Russell (10)
| Barclays Center17,732
| 39–38

|- style="background:#fbb;"
| 78
| April 1
| Milwaukee
| 
| Russell (28)
| Davis (14)
| LeVert (6)
| Barclays Center17,732
| 39–39
|- style="background:#fbb;"
| 79
| April 3
| Toronto
| 
| Russell (27)
| Allen (9)
| Russell (6)
| Barclays Center17,732
| 39–40
|- style="background:#bfb;"
| 80
| April 6
| @ Milwaukee
| 
| Russell (25)
| Allen (7)
| Russell (10)
| Fiserv Forum18,116
| 40–40
|- style="background:#bfb;"
| 81
| April 7
| @ Indiana
| 
| Russell (20)
| Allen (8)
| Dinwiddie, Russell (6)
| Bankers Life Fieldhouse16,197
| 41–40
|- style="background:#bfb;"
| 82
| April 10
| Miami
| 
| Russell (21)
| Allen (14)
| Dinwiddie, Napier, Russell (5)
| Barclays Center17,732
| 42–40

Playoffs

|- style="background:#bfb;"
| 1
| April 13
| @ Philadelphia
| 
| Russell (26)
| Davis (16)
| Dudley, Russell (4)
| Wells Fargo Center20,437
| 1–0
|- style="background:#fbb;"
| 2
| April 15
| @ Philadelphia
| 
| Dinwiddie (19)
| Allen (6)
| Allen (4)
| Wells Fargo Center20,591
| 1–1
|- style="background:#fbb;"
| 3
| April 18
| Philadelphia
| 
| LeVert, Russell (26)
| LeVert (7)
| Hollis-Jefferson, Russell (3)
| Barclays Center17,732
| 1–2
|- style="background:#fbb;"
| 4
| April 20
| Philadelphia
| 
| LeVert (25)
| Allen (8)
| LeVert, Russell (6)
| Barclays Center17,732
| 1–3
|- style="background:#fbb;"
| 5
| April 23
| @ Philadelphia
| 
| Hollis-Jefferson (21)
| Allen (9)
| Napier (10)
| Wells Fargo Center20,595
| 1–4

Player statistics

Regular season statistics
As of April 10, 2019

|-
| style="text-align:left;"| || 80 || 80 || 26.2 || .590 || .133 || .709 || 8.4 || 1.4 || .5 || 1.5 || 10.9
|-
| style="text-align:left;"| || 67 || 8 || 25.4 || .395 || .342 || .760 || 5.2 || 1.3 || .5 || .1 || 11.1
|-
| style="text-align:left;"| || 43 || 20 || 26.3 || .367 || .378 || .732 || 3.4 || 1.1 || .5 || .3 || 9.6
|-
| style="text-align:left;"| || 4 || 0 || 9.0 || .500 || .000 || .714 || 2.5 || 1.3 || .3 || .0 || 3.8
|-
| style="text-align:left;"| || 81 || 1 || 17.9 || .616 || .000 || .617 || 8.6 || .8 || .4 || .4 || 5.8
|-
| style="text-align:left;"| || 68 || 4 || 28.1 || .442 || .335 || .806 || 2.4 || 4.6 || .6 || .3 || 16.8
|-
| style="text-align:left;"| || 59 || 25 || 20.7 || .423 || .351 || .696 || 2.6 || 1.4 || .6 || .3 || 4.9
|-
| style="text-align:left;"| || 12 || 0 || 9.8 || .595 || .200 || .625 || 3.7 || .2 || .2 || .3 || 5.1
|-
| style="text-align:left;"| || 35 || 21 || 20.4 || .335 || .297 || .818 || 3.1 || 1.0 || .4 || .2 || 5.3
|-
| style="text-align:left;"| || 76 || 76 || 30.2 || .500 || .474 || .827 || 3.8 || 2.4 || .5 || .2 || 13.7
|-
| style="text-align:left;"| || 59 || 21 || 20.9 || .411 || .184 || .645 || 5.3 || 1.6 || .7 || .5 || 8.9
|-
| style="text-align:left;"| || 63 || 46 || 20.5 || .450 || .315 || .783 || 3.9 || .8 || .7 || .4 || 8.9
|-
| style="text-align:left;"| || 40 || 25 || 26.6 || .429 || .312 || .691 || 3.8 || 3.9 || 1.1 || .4 || 13.7
|-
| style="text-align:left;"| || 1 || 0 || 8.0 || .667 || .000 || .000 || 1.0 || .0 || .0 || .0 || 4.0
|-
| style="text-align:left;"| || 9 || 0 || 4.3 || .409 || .100 || .000 || .6 || .2 || .2 || .0 || 2.1
|-
| style="text-align:left;"| || 56 || 2 || 17.6 || .389 || .333 || .833 || 1.8 || 2.6 || .7 || .3 || 9.4
|-
| style="text-align:left;"| || 18 || 0 || 11.7 || .342 || .261 || .864 || 2.0 || 1.2 || .3 || .0 || 4.5
|-
| style="text-align:left;"| || 81 || 81 || 30.2 || .434 || .369 || .780 || 3.9 || 7.0 || 1.2 || .2 || 21.1
|-
| style="text-align:left;"| || 5 || 0 || 5.2 || .615 || .000 || .500 || 3.8 || .6 || .2 || .0 || 3.6

Playoff statistics
As of April 23, 2019

|-
| style="text-align:left;"| || 5 || 5 || 22.0 || .594 ||  || .850 || 6.8 || 2.2 || .6 || .6 || 11.0
|-
| style="text-align:left;"| || 5 || 3 || 23.8 || .237 || .292 || 1.000 || 4.0 || .4 || .8 || .0 || 6.6
|-
| style="text-align:left;"| || 3 || 0 || 13.7 || .700 ||  || 1.000 || 6.3 || .7 || .0 || .3 || 5.3
|-
| style="text-align:left;"| || 5 || 0 || 26.2 || .435 || .375 || .714 || 2.6 || 1.6 || .4 || .0 || 14.6
|-
| style="text-align:left;"| || 4 || 2 || 20.5 || .273 || .222 || 1.000 || .5 || 2.8 || .8 || .3 || 3.0
|-
| style="text-align:left;"| || 5 || 0 || 15.8 || .200 || .000 || .500 || 2.2 || .6 || .4 || .2 || 1.4
|-
| style="text-align:left;"| || 5 || 5 || 29.8 || .372 || .190 || 1.000 || 4.2 || .6 || .6 || .0 || 8.8
|-
| style="text-align:left;"| || 4 || 0 || 15.5 || .485 || 1.000 || .800 || 3.0 || 1.5 || .3 || 1.3 || 13.3
|-
| style="text-align:left;"| || 4 || 3 || 17.0 || .400 || .250 || .778 || 5.0 || .8 || .5 || .0 || 6.3
|-
| style="text-align:left;"| || 5 || 2 || 28.8 || .493 || .462 || .724 || 4.6 || 3.0 || 1.0 || .4 || 21.0
|-
| style="text-align:left;"| || 2 || 0 || 7.5 || .667 || .000 ||  || .0 || .0 || 1.0 || .0 || 2.0
|-
| style="text-align:left;"| || 3 || 0 || 9.3 || .636 || .600 || .875 || 2.3 || 3.7 || .3 || .0 || 8.0
|-
| style="text-align:left;"| || 3 || 0 || 7.3 || .375 || .429 ||  || 1.0 || 1.0 || .7 || .0 || 3.0
|-
| style="text-align:left;"| || 5 || 5 || 29.6 || .363 || .324 ||.846  || 3.6 || 3.6 || 1.4 || .2 || 19.4

Transactions

Trades

Additions

Subtractions

References

External links
 2018–19 Brooklyn Nets at Basketball-Reference.com

Brooklyn Nets season
Brooklyn Nets seasons
Brooklyn Nets
Brooklyn Nets
2010s in Brooklyn
Events in Brooklyn, New York
Prospect Heights, Brooklyn